Travassos may refer to:
 Places
 Travassós (postal code: 4820), a parish in the Fafe municipality, Portugal
 Travassos (parish) (postal code: 4830), a parish in the Póvoa de Lanhoso municipality, Portugal
 Estádio Palma Travassos, a multi-use stadium in Ribeirão Preto, Brazil

 People
 Diogo Gonçalves de Travassos (1390s-1449), a Portuguese nobleman
 Haroldo Travassos (1922–1977), a Brazilian ichthyologist, son of Lauro Travassos
 José Travassos (1926–2002), a Portuguese football player
 José Travassos Valdez, 1st Count of Bonfim (1787–1862), a Portuguese soldier and statesman
 Lauro Travassos (1890–1970), a Brazilian entomologist, father of Haroldo Travassos